Mehkar Assembly constituency is one of the 288 constituencies of Maharashtra Vidhan Sabha and one of the seven which are located in the Buldhana district. It is reserved for Scheduled Caste candidates.

It is a part of the Buldhana (Lok Sabha constituency) along with five other Vidhan Sabha (assembly) constituencies, viz. Buldhana, Chikhali,  Sindkhed Raja,    Khamgaon and Jalgaon(Jamod),

The seventh Malkapur Assembly constituency from Buldhana district is a part of the Raver (Lok Sabha constituency) from neighbouring Jalgaon district.

This city based on the bank of the Painganga. Painganga source through Satmala Agintha Dongar.

As per orders of Delimitation of Parliamentary and Assembly constituencies Order, 2008, No. 25 Mehkar Assembly constituency is composed of the following: 
1. Mehkar Tehsil, 2. Lonar Tehsil (Part), Revenue Circle Sultanpur, Titavi and Lonar, Lonar (MC) of Buldhana district.

Members of Legislative Assembly

References

Assembly constituencies of Maharashtra